Bun-sgoil Ghàidhlig Phort Righ is a Gaelic-medium primary school in Portree on Skye, Scotland. The school opened April 2018, becoming the third purpose-built Gaelic school in the Highland Council area.
The £8.7million building was built by Robertson Construction.

One local councillor criticised the new school as a "disaster for community relations” as pupils in a small community should not be divided by language.

See also
 Bun-sgoil Ghàidhlig Inbhir Nis
 Bun-sgoil Taobh na Pàirce

References

Primary schools in Highland (council area)
Scottish Gaelic education
Educational institutions established in 2018
2018 establishments in Scotland
Portree